Tang Xingqiang (Chinese: 汤星强; born 11 August 1995) is a Chinese track and field sprinter who competes in the 100 metres. He represented his country at the 2016 Summer Olympics.

He made his international senior debut at the 2015 Asian Athletics Championships, competing in the 200 metres and reaching the semi-finals.

At the 2016 Rio Olympics he led off a Chinese 4 × 100 metres relay quartet including Xie Zhenye, Su Bingtian, and Zhang Peimeng. The team set an Asian record of 37.82 seconds in qualifying and finished fourth in the final. The record was quickly broken by Japan in the following relay heat, but it remains the Chinese record.

Personal bests
60 metres – 6.56 (2016)
100 metres – 10.22 (2021)
200 metres – 20.39 (2021)
200 metres indoor – 22.00 (2016)
4 × 100 metres relay – 37.79 (2021)

International competitions

1Disqualified in the final

References

External links

Living people
1995 births
Chinese male sprinters
Olympic athletes of China
Athletes (track and field) at the 2016 Summer Olympics
People from Ningde
Runners from Fujian
Athletes (track and field) at the 2020 Summer Olympics
Medalists at the 2020 Summer Olympics
Olympic bronze medalists for China
Olympic bronze medalists in athletics (track and field)